The PBA on Vintage Sports was a branding used for presentation of Philippine Basketball Association games produced by Vintage Sports, a sports-oriented media company and was aired on Philippine television networks City2 Television from 1982 to 1983, Maharlika Broadcasting System (later renamed as People's Television Network) from 1984 to 1995, and Intercontinental Broadcasting Corporation from 1996 to 1999.

History

In 1982, the PBA awarded the broadcast rights of its games to Vintage Enterprises, Inc., a company owned by Carlos "Bobong" Velez and signed a P5.4 million deal with the league.

Games were aired on City2 Television, with the second game of a doubleheader aired live and the first game followed afterwards on a delayed basis. One play-by-play and one analyst was assigned to cover both games.

For the first three years of Vintage's coverage, they had the legendary sports commentator Joe Cantada and Pinggoy Pengson as its main anchors with Steve Kattan and Andy Jao as the analysts. Future PBA commissioner Jun Bernardino served as the sideline reporter (dubbed as the "Man on the Ball"). Occasional analysts were also added in the panel, which includes Freddie Webb, Norman Black and Joaqui Trillo.

Several innovations were added by Vintage to the PBA coverage compared to their predecessor, including the "Man on the Ball" feature, which acts as a sideline reporter, "Inside Basketball", which discusses the basketball fundamentals (hosted by Steve Kattan, then later Norman Black), and "Winner's Profile", a feature segment about the players during their off-the-court activities. They also changed the delivery of the panelists by bringing out insights from the action in the game with less emphasis on play-by-play.

The orientation of the main camera was changed since the 1983 Open Conference, with the team benches moved at the bottom of the screen. This is to accommodate additional advertisement when the main camera pans at the basketball court. Team huddles during timeouts were also included since 1984.

After the PBA's transfer to The ULTRA in 1985, Ronnie Nathanielsz, Sev Sarmenta and Ed Picson were later added as additional play-by-play commentators. Vintage also transferred to the Maharlika Broadcasting System (later renamed as the People's Television Network after the People Power Revolution in 1986) as their TV network.

In 1987, Vintage started airing PBA doubleheaders live, and they assign a different play-by-play commentator for both games, although the analyst will still cover both games. Beginning in 1988, Romy Kintanar did the halftime features, entitled "Kaypee at the Half".

Starting the 1989 All-Filipino Conference, Vintage used a character generator score bug, which replaced the "keyed" score bug used since 1982. A dedicated camera was also designated for the game clock so it can be superimposed with the score bug. This was done on a sporadic basis in 1984 and 1986. A CG game clock was used for the 1987 season.

After Cantada's death in March 1992, Ed Picson, Sev Sarmenta and Bill Velasco became the main anchors with Quinito Henson, Andy Jao and Butch Maniego as color commentators. Later additions were Jimmy Javier and Noli Eala (who served as an analyst first then becoming a play-by-play commentator in 1995). Starting in 1993, a different game analyst was assigned for doubleheaders.

In 1996, Vintage transferred to Intercontinental Broadcasting Corporation (IBC) as part of the launching of Vintage Television, a prime time slot that aired on IBC.  They also changed the main language in delivering the games, from an all-English format to taglish (mixed Tagalog and English). Radio commentators such as Chino Trinidad, Rado Dimalibot, and Randy Sacdalan were elevated to TV broadcast.

Over the next three seasons, Vintage paid the league a total of over two billion pesos (135 million in 1997, 1.885 billion in 1998 and over 300 million in 1999).

From 1997 to 1998, the games are also aired at ESPN Asia. A different panel were assigned for the ESPN broadcast, which usually headed by Ronnie Nathanielsz.

By 1998, Sarmenta, Velasco and Maniego left for ABS-CBN Sports to be the main presenters for the network's newly established league, the Metropolitan Basketball Association (MBA). Trinidad and Yeng Guiao would also become one of the most popular tandems in Vintage Sports. Eala and Picson would often tandem with Henson and Jao. Radio commentators Benjie Santiago and Mon Liboro was also elevated to the TV coverage.

In 1999, Anthony Suntay and Chiqui Roa-Puno, or at times Paolo Trillo, Jannelle So and Dong Alejar became the pregame and halftime hosts for the coverage. Also, the games were aired on Eagle Broadcasting Corporation's Net 25 on a slightly delayed basis.

End of PBA on Vintage Sports

On December 12, 1999,  Vintage Sports aired its last PBA game  during Game 6 of the 1999 Governor's Cup between the Alaska Milkmen and the San Miguel Beermen were played at the Araneta Coliseum and before merging with Viva TV in 2000. Ed Picson and Andy Jao were the commentators and the sideline reporters were Ronnie Nathanielsz, Jannelle So Chiqui Roa-Puno and Dong Alejar for its last run.

Viva Entertainment merger

In 2000, Vintage Television merged with Viva Television and signed a 770 million pesos deal with 3 years. It defeated the bid of GMA Network, who was hoping to win the bid to compete with television rival ABS-CBN, who had the television rights to cover the rival league Metropolitan Basketball Association.

Music
Vintage Sports used different themes in every season the covered the PBA games. During their first years covering the league, they incorporate pop music when cutting into a commercial break. The list of their main themes are as follows:
 - PBA on Vintage Sports theme (in-house music)
 - Pushing The Limit by G. Kavanagh and Hennie Bekker
 - Barcelona by John Tesh (also used Shock by John Tesh as secondary theme)

List of broadcasters

See also
 Philippine Basketball Association
 PBA on Viva TV
 PBA on NBN/IBC
 PBA on ABC
 PBA on One Sports
 List of programs aired by Banahaw Broadcasting Corporation
 List of programs aired by People's Television Network
 List of programs previously broadcast by Intercontinental Broadcasting Corporation

References

Bibliography
 PBA, The First 25 (2000, PBA Books) p. 33
 PBA 20 Years at the Pictures (1994, PBA Books) pp. 118–119 [Images]

Vintage Sports
People's Television Network original programming
Intercontinental Broadcasting Corporation original programming
1982 Philippine television series debuts
1999 Philippine television series endings
1980s Philippine television series
1990s Philippine television series
Philippine sports television series